

Events

Pre-1600
 598 – Balkan Campaign: The Avars lift the siege at the Byzantine stronghold of Tomis. Their leader Bayan I retreats north of the Danube River after the Avaro-Slavic hordes are decimated by the plague.
1282 – The people of Sicily rebel against the Angevin king Charles I, in what becomes known as the Sicilian Vespers.
1296 – Edward I sacks Berwick-upon-Tweed, during armed conflict between Scotland and England.

1601–1900
1699 – Guru Gobind Singh establishes the Khalsa in Anandpur Sahib, Punjab.
1815 – Joachim Murat issues the Rimini Proclamation which would later inspire Italian unification.
1818 – Physicist Augustin Fresnel reads a memoir on optical rotation to the French Academy of Sciences, reporting that when polarized light is "depolarized" by a Fresnel rhomb, its properties are preserved in any subsequent passage through an optically-rotating crystal or liquid.
1822 – The Florida Territory is created in the United States.
1841 – The National Bank of Greece is founded in Athens.
1842 – Ether anesthesia is used for the first time, in an operation by the American surgeon Dr. Crawford Long.
1844 – One of the most important battles of the Dominican War of Independence from Haiti takes place near the city of Santiago de los Caballeros.
1855 – Origins of the American Civil War: "Border Ruffians" from Missouri invade Kansas and force election of a pro-slavery legislature.
1856 – The Treaty of Paris is signed, ending the Crimean War.
1861 – Discovery of the chemical elements: Sir William Crookes announces his discovery of thallium.
1863 – Danish prince Wilhelm Georg is chosen as King George of Greece.
1867 – Alaska is purchased from Russia for $7.2 million, about two cents/acre ($4.19/km2), by United States Secretary of State William H. Seward.
1870 – Texas is readmitted to the United States Congress following Reconstruction.
1885 – The Battle for Kushka triggers the Panjdeh Incident which nearly gives rise to war between the Russian and British Empires.
1899 – German Society of Chemistry issues an invitation to other national scientific organizations to appoint delegates to the International Committee on Atomic Weights.
1900 – Archaeologists in Knossos, Crete, discover the first clay tablet with hieroglyphic writing in a script later called Linear B.

1901–present
1912 – Sultan Abd al-Hafid signs the Treaty of Fez, making Morocco a French protectorate.
1918 – Beginning of the bloody March Events in Baku and other locations of Baku Governorate.
1939 – The Heinkel He 100 fighter sets a world airspeed record of 463 mph (745 km/h).
1940 – Second Sino-Japanese War: Japan declares Nanking capital of a new Chinese puppet government, nominally controlled by Wang Jingwei.
1944 – World War II: Allied bombers conduct their most severe bombing run on Sofia, Bulgaria.
  1944   – Out of 795 Lancasters, Halifaxes and Mosquitos sent to attack Nuremberg, 95 bombers do not return, making it the largest RAF Bomber Command loss of the war.
1945 – World War II: Soviet forces invade Austria and capture Vienna. Polish and Soviet forces liberate Danzig.
1949 – Cold War: A riot breaks out in Austurvöllur square in Reykjavík, when Iceland joins NATO.
1959 – Tenzin Gyatso, the 14th Dalai Lama, flees Tibet for India.
1961 – The Single Convention on Narcotic Drugs is signed in New York City.
1965 – Vietnam War: A car bomb explodes in front of the United States Embassy, Saigon, killing 22 and wounding 183 others.
1967 – Delta Air Lines Flight 9877 crashes at Louis Armstrong New Orleans International Airport, killing 19.
1972 – Vietnam War: The Easter Offensive begins after North Vietnamese forces cross into the Demilitarized Zone (DMZ) of South Vietnam.
1976 – Israeli-Palestinian conflict: in the first organized response against Israeli policies by a Palestinian collective since 1948, Palestinians create the first Land Day.
1979 – Airey Neave, a British Member of Parliament (MP), is killed by a car bomb as he exits the Palace of Westminster. The Irish National Liberation Army claims responsibility.
1981 – U.S. President Ronald Reagan is shot in the chest outside a Washington, D.C., hotel by John Hinckley, Jr.; three others are wounded in the same incident. 
1982 – Space Shuttle program: STS-3 mission is completed with the landing of Columbia at White Sands Missile Range, New Mexico.
2002 – The 2002 Lyon car attack takes place. 
2008 – Drolma Kyi arrested by Chinese authorities.
2009 – Twelve gunmen attack the Manawan Police Academy in Lahore, Pakistan.
2011 – Min Aung Hlaing is appointed as the Commander-in-Chief of Myanmar's armed forces.
2017 – SpaceX conducts the world's first reflight of an orbital class rocket.
2018 – Israeli Army killed 17 Palestinians and wounded 1,400 in Gaza during Land Day protests.
2019 – Pope Francis visits Morocco.

Births

Pre-1600
 892 – Shi Jingtang, founder of the Later Jin Dynasty (d. 942)
1135 – Maimonides, Spanish rabbi and philosopher (April 6 also proposed, d. 1204)
1326 – Ivan II of Moscow (d. 1359)
1432 – Mehmed the Conqueror, Ottoman sultan (d. 1481)
1510 – Antonio de Cabezón, Spanish composer and organist (d. 1566)
1551 – Salomon Schweigger, German theologian (d. 1622)

1601–1900
1606 – Vincentio Reinieri, Italian mathematician and astronomer (d. 1647)
1632 – John Proctor, farmer hanged for witchcraft in the Salem witch trials (d. 1692)
1640 – John Trenchard, English politician, Secretary of State for the Northern Department (d. 1695)
1727 – Tommaso Traetta, Italian composer and educator (d. 1779)
1746 – Francisco Goya, Spanish-French painter and sculptor (d. 1828)
1750 – John Stafford Smith, English organist and composer (d. 1836)
1793 – Juan Manuel de Rosas, Argentinian soldier and politician, 13th Governor of Buenos Aires Province (d. 1877)
1805 – Ferdinand Johann Wiedemann, German-Swedish linguist and botanist (d. 1887)
1811 – Robert Bunsen, German chemist and academic (d. 1899)
1820 – Anna Sewell, English author (d. 1878)
  1820   – James Whyte, Scottish-Australian politician, 6th Premier of Tasmania (d. 1882)
1844 – Paul Verlaine, French poet (d. 1896)
1853 – Vincent van Gogh, Dutch-French painter and illustrator (d. 1890)
1853 – Arnoldo Sartorio, German composer, pianist, and teacher (d. 1936)
1857 – Léon Charles Thévenin, French engineer (d. 1926)
1858 – Siegfried Alkan, German composer (d. 1941)
1863 – Mary Calkins, American philosopher and psychologist (d. 1930)
1864 – Franz Oppenheimer, German-American sociologist and economist (d. 1943)
1874 – Charles Lightoller, English 2nd officer on the RMS Titanic (d. 1952)
  1874   – Josiah McCracken, American hammer thrower, shot putter, and football player (d. 1962)
  1874   – Nicolae Rădescu, Romanian general and politician, Prime Minister of Romania (d. 1953)
1875 – Thomas Xenakis, Greek-American gymnast (d. 1942)
1879 – Coen de Koning, Dutch speed skater (d. 1954)
1880 – Seán O'Casey, Irish dramatist, playwright, and memoirist (d. 1964)
1882 – Melanie Klein, Austrian-English psychologist and author (d. 1960)
1888 – J. R. Williams, Canadian-born cartoonist (d. 1957)
1891 – Chunseong, Korean monk, writer and philosopher (d. 1977)
1892 – Stefan Banach, Polish mathematician and academic (d. 1945)
  1892   – Fortunato Depero, Italian painter and sculptor (d. 1960)
  1892   – Erhard Milch, German field marshal (d. 1972)
  1892   – Johannes Pääsuke, Estonian photographer and director (d. 1918)
  1892   – Erwin Panofsky, German historian and academic (d. 1968)
1894 – Tommy Green, English race walker (d. 1975)
  1894   – Sergey Ilyushin, Russian engineer, founded Ilyushin Aircraft Company (d. 1977)
1895 – Jean Giono, French author and poet (d. 1970)
  1895   – Carl Lutz, Swiss vice-consul to Hungary during WWII, credited with saving over 62,000 Jews (d. 1975)
  1895   – Charlie Wilson, English footballer (d. 1971)
1899 – Sharadindu Bandyopadhyay, Indian author, playwright, and screenwriter (d. 1970)

1901–present
1902 – Brooke Astor, American socialite and philanthropist (d. 2007)
  1902   – Ted Heath, English trombonist and composer (d. 1969)
1903 – Joy Ridderhof, American missionary (d. 1984)
1904 – Ripper Collins, American baseball player and coach (d. 1970)
1905 – Archie Birkin, English motorcycle racer (d. 1927)
  1905   – Mikio Oda, Japanese triple jumper and academic (d. 1998)
  1905   – Albert Pierrepoint, English hangman (d. 1992)
1907 – Friedrich August Freiherr von der Heydte, German general (d. 1994)
1910 – Józef Marcinkiewicz, Polish soldier, mathematician, and academic (d. 1940)
1911 – Ekrem Akurgal, Turkish archaeologist and academic (d. 2002)
1912 – Jack Cowie, New Zealand cricketer (d. 1994)
  1912   – Alvin Hamilton, Canadian lieutenant and politician, 18th Canadian Minister of Agriculture (d. 2004)
1913 – Marc Davis, American animator (d. 2000)
  1913   – Richard Helms, American soldier and diplomat, 8th Director of Central Intelligence (d. 2002)
  1913   – Frankie Laine, American singer-songwriter (d. 2007)
  1913   – Ċensu Tabone, Maltese general, physician, and politician, 4th President of Malta (d. 2012)
1914 – Sonny Boy Williamson I, American singer-songwriter and harmonica player (d. 1948)
1915 – Pietro Ingrao, Italian journalist and politician (d. 2015)
1917 – Els Aarne, Ukrainian-Estonian pianist, composer, and educator (d. 1995)
1919 – McGeorge Bundy, American intelligence officer and diplomat, 6th United States National Security Advisor (d. 1996)
  1919   – Robin Williams, New Zealand mathematician, university administrator and public servant (d. 2013)
1921 – André Fontaine, French historian and journalist (d. 2013)
1922 – Turhan Bey, American actor (d. 2012)
  1922   – Arthur Wightman, American physicist and academic (d. 2013)
1923 – Milton Acorn, Canadian poet and playwright (d. 1986)
1926 – Ingvar Kamprad, Swedish businessman, founded IKEA (d. 2018)
1927 – Wally Grout, Australian cricketer (d. 1968)
1928 – Robert Badinter, French lawyer and politician, French Minister of Justice
  1928   – Colin Egar, Australian cricket umpire (d. 2008)
  1928   – Tom Sharpe, English-Spanish author and educator (d. 2013)
1929 – Richard Dysart, American actor (d. 2015)
  1929   – Ray Musto, American soldier and politician (d. 2014)
  1929   – István Rózsavölgyi, Hungarian runner (d. 2012)
1930 – John Astin, American actor 
  1930   – Rolf Harris, Australian singer-songwriter
1933 – Jean-Claude Brialy, French actor and director (d. 2007)
  1933   – Joe Ruby, American animator (d. 2020)
1934 – Paul Crouch, American broadcaster, co-founded the Trinity Broadcasting Network (d. 2013)
  1934   – Hans Hollein, Austrian architect and academic, designed Haas House (d. 2014)
1935 – Karl Berger, German pianist and composer
  1935   – Willie Galimore, American football player (d. 1964)
  1935   – Gordon Mumma, American composer
1937 – Warren Beatty, American actor, director, producer, and screenwriter
  1937   – Ian MacLaurin, Baron MacLaurin of Knebworth, English businessman
1938 – John Barnhill, American basketball player and coach (d. 2013)
  1938   – Klaus Schwab, German economist and engineer, founded the World Economic Forum
1940 – Norman Gifford, English cricketer
  1940   – Jerry Lucas, American basketball player and educator
  1940   – Hans Ragnemalm, Swedish lawyer and judge (d. 2016)
1941 – Graeme Edge, English singer-songwriter and drummer (d. 2021)
  1941   – Ron Johnston, English geographer and academic (d. 2020)
  1941   – Wasim Sajjad, Pakistani lawyer and politician, President of Pakistan
  1941   – Bob Smith, American soldier and politician
1942 – Ruben Kun, Nauruan lawyer and politician, 14th President of Nauru (d. 2014)
  1942   – Tane Norton, New Zealand rugby player
  1942   – Kenneth Welsh, Canadian actor (d. 2022) 
1943 – Jay Traynor, American pop and doo-wop singer (d. 2014)
1944 – Mark Wylea Erwin, American businessman and diplomat
  1944   – Brian Wilshire, Australian radio host 
1945 – Eric Clapton, English guitarist and singer-songwriter 
1947 – Lorenzo Kom'boa Ervin, American activist, writer, and black anarchist
  1947   – Dick Roche, Irish politician, Minister of State for European Affairs
  1947   – Terje Venaas, Norwegian bassist
1948 – Nigel Jones, Baron Jones of Cheltenham, English computer programmer and politician
  1948   – Eddie Jordan, Irish racing driver and team owner, founded Jordan Grand Prix
  1948   – Mervyn King, English economist and academic
  1948   – Jim "Dandy" Mangrum, American rock singer
1949 – Liza Frulla, Canadian talk show host and politician, 3rd Minister of Canadian Heritage
  1949   – Dana Gillespie, English singer-songwriter and actress
  1949   – Naomi Sims, American model and author (d. 2009)
1950 – Janet Browne, English-American historian and academic
  1950   – Robbie Coltrane, Scottish actor (d. 2022)
  1950   – Grady Little, American baseball player, coach, and manager
1952 – Stuart Dryburgh, English-New Zealand cinematographer
  1952   – Peter Knights, Australian footballer and coach
1955 – Randy VanWarmer, American singer-songwriter and guitarist (d. 2004)
1956 – Bill Butler, Scottish educator and politician
  1956   – Juanito Oiarzabal, Spanish mountaineer
  1956   – Paul Reiser, American actor and comedian
  1956   – Shahla Sherkat, Iranian journalist and author
1957 – Marie-Christine Koundja, Chadian author and diplomat
1958 – Maurice LaMarche, Canadian voice actor and stand-up comedian
  1958   – Joey Sindelar, American golfer
1959 – Martina Cole, English television host and author
1960 – Laurie Graham, Canadian skier
  1960   – Bill Johnson, American skier (d. 2016)
1961 – Mike Thackwell, New Zealand racing driver
  1961   – Doug Wickenheiser, Canadian-American ice hockey player (d. 1999)
1962 – Mark Begich, American politician
  1962   – MC Hammer, American rapper and actor
  1962   – Gary Stevens, English international footballer and manager 
1963 – Tsakhiagiin Elbegdorj, Mongolian journalist and politician, 4th President of Mongolia 
  1963   – Panagiotis Tsalouchidis, Greek footballer
1964 – Vlado Bozinovski, Macedonian-Australian footballer and manager
  1964   – Tracy Chapman, American singer-songwriter and guitarist
1965 – Piers Morgan, English journalist and talk show host 
1966 – Efstratios Grivas, Greek chess player and author
  1966   – Dmitry Volkov, Russian swimmer
  1966   – Leonid Voloshin, Russian triple jumper
1967 – Christopher Bowman, American figure skater and coach (d. 2008)
  1967   – Richard Hutten, Dutch furniture designer
  1967   – Julie Richardson, New Zealand tennis player
1968 – Celine Dion, Canadian singer-songwriter
1969 – Troy Bayliss, Australian motorcycle racer
1970 – Tobias Hill, English poet and author
  1970   – Sylvain Charlebois, Canadian food/agriculture researcher and author
1971 – Mari Holden, American cyclist
  1971   – Mark Consuelos, American actor and television personality
1972 – Mili Avital, Israeli-American actress
  1972   – Emerson Thome, Brazilian footballer and scout
  1972   – Karel Poborský, Czech footballer
1973 – Adam Goldstein, American keyboard player, DJ, and producer (d. 2009)
  1973   – Jan Koller, Czech footballer
  1973   – Kareem Streete-Thompson, Caymanian-American long jumper
1974 – Martin Love, Australian cricketer
1975 – Paul Griffen, New Zealand-Italian rugby player
1976 – Ty Conklin, American ice hockey player
  1976   – Obadele Thompson, Barbadian sprinter
  1976   – Troels Lund Poulsen, Danish politician, Minister for Education of Denmark
1977 – Abhishek Chaubey, Indian director and screenwriter
1978 – Paweł Czapiewski, Polish runner
  1978   – Chris Paterson, Scottish rugby player and coach
  1978   – Bok van Blerk, South African singer-songwriter and actor
1979 – Norah Jones, American singer-songwriter and pianist 
  1979   – Anatoliy Tymoshchuk, Ukrainian footballer
1980 – Ricardo Osorio, Mexican footballer
1981 – Jammal Brown, American football player
  1981   – Andrea Masi, Italian rugby player
1982 – Mark Hudson, English footballer
  1982   – Philippe Mexès, French footballer
  1982   – Javier Portillo, Spanish footballer
  1982   – Jason Dohring, American actor
1983 – Jérémie Aliadière, French footballer
1984 – Mario Ančić, Croatian tennis player
  1984   – Samantha Stosur, Australian tennis player
1985 – Giacomo Ricci, Italian racing driver 
1986 – Sergio Ramos, Spanish footballer
1987 – Trent Barreta, American wrestler
  1987   – Calum Elliot, Scottish footballer
  1987   – Kwok Kin Pong, Hong Kong footballer
  1987   – Marc-Édouard Vlasic, Canadian ice hockey player
1988 – Will Matthews, Australian rugby league player
  1988   – Thanasis Papazoglou, Greek footballer
  1988   – Richard Sherman, American football player
  1988   – Larisa Yurkiw, Canadian alpine skier
1989 – Chris Sale, American baseball player
  1989   – João Sousa, Portuguese tennis player
1990 – Thomas Rhett, American country music singer and songwriter 
  1990   – Michal Březina, Czech figure skater
1992 – Palak Muchhal, Indian playback singer
1993 – Anitta, Brazilian singer and entertainer
1994 – Alex Bregman, American baseball player
  1994   – Jetro Willems, Dutch footballer
1997 – Lee Dong-min, South Korean singer, actor, and model
1998 – Kalyn Ponga, Australian rugby league player
2000 – Colton Herta, American race car driver
2001 – Anastasia Potapova, Russian tennis player

Deaths

Pre-1600
116 – Quirinus of Neuss, Roman martyr and saint
365 – Ai of Jin, emperor of the Jin Dynasty (b. 341)
 943 – Li Bian, emperor of Southern Tang (b. 889)
 987 – Arnulf II, Count of Flanders (b. 960)
1180 – Al-Mustadi, Caliph (b. 1142)
1202 – Joachim of Fiore, Italian mystic and theologian (b. 1135)
1465 – Isabella of Clermont, queen consort of Naples (b. c. 1424)
1472 – Amadeus IX, Duke of Savoy (b. 1435)
1486 – Thomas Bourchier, English cardinal (b. 1404)
1526 – Konrad Mutian, German humanist (b. 1471)
1540 – Matthäus Lang von Wellenburg, German cardinal (b. 1469)
1559 – Adam Ries, German mathematician and academic (b. 1492)
1587 – Ralph Sadler, English politician, Secretary of State for England (b. 1507)

1601–1900
1662 – François le Métel de Boisrobert, French poet and playwright (b. 1592)
1689 – Kazimierz Łyszczyński, Polish atheist and philosopher (b. 1634)
1707 – Sébastien Le Prestre de Vauban, French general and engineer (b. 1633)
1764 – Pietro Locatelli, Italian violinist and composer (b. 1695)
1783 – William Hunter, Scottish anatomist and physician (b. 1718)
1804 – Victor-François, 2nd duc de Broglie, French general and politician, French Secretary of State for War (b. 1718)
1806 – Georgiana Cavendish, Duchess of Devonshire (b. 1757)
1830 – Louis I, Grand Duke of Baden (b. 1763)
1840 – Beau Brummell, English-French fashion designer (b. 1778)
1842 – Louise Élisabeth Vigée Le Brun, French painter (b. 1755)
1864 – Louis Schindelmeisser, German clarinet player, composer, and conductor (b. 1811)
1873 – Bénédict Morel, Austrian-French psychiatrist and physician (b. 1809)
1874 – Carl Julian (von) Graba, German lawyer and ornithologist who visited and studied the Faroe Islands (b. 1799)
1879 – Thomas Couture, French painter and educator (b. 1815)
1886 – Joseph-Alfred Mousseau, Canadian judge and politician, 6th Premier of Quebec (b. 1838)
1896 – Charilaos Trikoupis, Greek politician, 55th Prime Minister of Greece (b. 1832)

1901–present
1912 – Karl May, German author (b. 1842)
1925 – Rudolf Steiner, Austrian philosopher and author (b. 1861)
1935 – Romanos Melikian, Armenian composer (b. 1883)
1936 – Conchita Supervía, Spanish soprano and actress (b. 1895)
1940 – Sir John Gilmour, 2nd Baronet Scottish soldier and politician, Secretary of State for Scotland (b. 1876)
1943 – Jan Bytnar, Polish lieutenant; WWII resistance fighter (b. 1921)
  1943   – Maciej Aleksy Dawidowski, Polish sergeant; WWII resistance fighter (b. 1920)
1945 – Béla Balogh, Hungarian actor, director, and screenwriter (b. 1885)
1949 – Friedrich Bergius, German chemist and academic, Nobel Prize laureate (b. 1884)
  1949   – Dattaram Hindlekar, Indian cricketer (b. 1909)
1950 – Léon Blum, French lawyer and politician, Prime Minister of France (b. 1872)
1952 – Nikos Beloyannis, Greek resistance leader and politician (b. 1915) 
  1952   – Jigme Wangchuck, Bhutanese king (b. 1905)
1955 – Harl McDonald, American pianist, composer, and conductor (b. 1899)
1956 – Edmund Clerihew Bentley, English author and poet (b. 1875)
1959 – Daniil Andreyev, Russian mystic and poet (b. 1906)
  1959   – John Auden, English solicitor, deputy coroner and a territorial soldier (b. 1894)
  1959   – Riccardo Zanella, Italian politician (b. 1875)
1960 – Joseph Haas, German composer and educator (b. 1879)
1961 – Philibert Jacques Melotte, English astronomer (b. 1880)
1963 – Aleksandr Gauk, Russian conductor and composer (b. 1893)
1964 – Nella Larsen, American nurse and author (b. 1891)
1965 – Philip Showalter Hench, American physician and academic, Nobel Prize laureate (b. 1896)
1966 – Newbold Morris, American lawyer and politician (b. 1902)
  1966   – Maxfield Parrish, American painter and illustrator (b. 1870)
  1966   – Erwin Piscator, German director and producer (b. 1893)
1967 – Frank Thorpe, Australian public servant (b. 1885)
  1967   – Jean Toomer, American poet and novelist (b. 1894)
1969 – Lucien Bianchi, Belgian racing driver (b. 1934)
1970 – Heinrich Brüning, German economist and politician, Chancellor of Germany (b. 1885)
1972 – Mahir Çayan, Turkish politician (b. 1946)
  1972   – Gabriel Heatter, American radio commentator (b. 1890)
1973 – Douglas Douglas-Hamilton, 14th Duke of Hamilton, Scottish pilot and politician (b. 1903)
  1973   – Yves Giraud-Cabantous, French racing driver (b. 1904)
1975 – Peter Bamm, German journalist and author (b. 1897)
1977 – Levko Revutsky, Ukrainian composer and educator (b. 1889)
1978 – George Paine, English cricketer and coach (b. 1908)
  1978   – Memduh Tağmaç, Turkish general (b. 1904)
1979 – Airey Neave, English colonel, lawyer, and politician, Shadow Secretary of State for Northern Ireland (b. 1916)
  1979   – Ray Ventura, French pianist and bandleader (b. 1908)
1981 – DeWitt Wallace, American publisher, co-founded Reader's Digest (b. 1889)
1984 – Karl Rahner, German-Austrian priest and theologian (b. 1904)
1985 – Harold Peary, American actor and singer (b. 1908)
1986 – James Cagney, American actor and dancer (b. 1899)
  1986   – John Ciardi, American poet and etymologist (b. 1916)
1988 – Edgar Faure, French historian and politician, Prime Minister of France (b. 1908)
1990 – Harry Bridges, Australian-born American activist and trade union leader (b. 1901)
1991 – Athanasios Ragazos, Greek long-distance runner (b. 1913) 
1992 – Manolis Andronikos, Greek archaeologist and academic (b. 1919)
1993 – S. M. Pandit, Indian painter (b. 1916)
  1993   – Richard Diebenkorn, American painter (b. 1922)
1995 – Rozelle Claxton, American pianist (b. 1913)
  1995   – Tony Lock, English-Australian cricketer and coach (b. 1929)
  1995   – Paul A. Rothchild, American record producer (b. 1935)
1996 – Hugh Falkus, English pilot and author (b. 1917)
  1996   – Ryoei Saito, Japanese businessman (b. 1916)
2000 – Rudolf Kirchschläger, Austrian judge and politician, 8th President of Austria (b. 1915)
2002 – Queen Elizabeth The Queen Mother of the United Kingdom (b. 1900)
  2002   – Anand Bakshi, Indian poet and lyricist (b. 1930)
2003 – Michael Jeter, American actor (b. 1952)
  2003   – Valentin Pavlov, Russian banker and politician, 11th Prime Minister of the Soviet Union (b. 1937)
2004 – Alistair Cooke, English-American journalist and author (b. 1908)
  2004   – Michael King, New Zealand historian and author (b. 1945)
  2004   – Timi Yuro, American singer and songwriter (b. 1940)
2005 – Robert Creeley, American novelist, essayist, and poet (b. 1926)
  2005   – Milton Green, American hurdler and soldier (b. 1913)
  2005   – Fred Korematsu, American political activist (b. 1919)
  2005   – Chrysanthos Theodoridis, Greek singer and songwriter (b. 1934) 
  2005   – O. V. Vijayan, Indian author and illustrator (b. 1930)
  2005   – Mitch Hedberg, American stand-up comedian (b. 1968)
2006 – Red Hickey, American football player and coach (b. 1917)
  2006   – John McGahern, Irish author and educator (b. 1934)
2007 – John Roberts, Canadian political scientist, academic, and politician, 46th Secretary of State for Canada (b. 1933)
2008 – Roland Fraïssé, French mathematical logician (b. 1920)
  2008   – David Leslie, Scottish racing driver (b. 1953)
  2008   – Richard Lloyd, English racing driver (b. 1945)
  2008   – Dith Pran, Cambodian-American photographer and journalist (b. 1942)
2010 – Jaime Escalante, Bolivian-American educator (b. 1930)
  2010   – Morris R. Jeppson, American lieutenant and physicist (b. 1922)
  2010   – Martin Sandberger, German SS officer (b. 1911)
2012 – Janet Anderson Perkin, Canadian baseball player and curler (b. 1921)
  2012   – Aquila Berlas Kiani, Indian-Canadian sociologist and academic (b. 1921)
  2012   – Francesco Mancini, Italian footballer and coach (b. 1968)
  2012   – Granville Semmes, American businessman, founded 1-800-Flowers (b. 1928)
  2012   – Leonid Shebarshin, Russian KGB officer (b. 1935)
2013 – Daniel Hoffman, American poet and academic (b. 1923)
  2013   – Bobby Parks, American basketball player and coach (b. 1962)
  2013   – Phil Ramone, South African-American songwriter and producer, co-founded A & R Recording (b. 1934)
  2013   – Edith Schaeffer, Chinese-Swiss religious leader and author, co-founded L'Abri (b. 1914)
  2013   – Bob Turley, American baseball player and coach (b. 1930)
2014 – Ray Hutchison, American lawyer and politician (b. 1932)
  2014   – Kate O'Mara, English actress (b. 1939)
2015 – Helmut Dietl, German director, producer, and screenwriter (b. 1944)
  2015   – Roger Slifer, American author, illustrator, screenwriter, and producer (b. 1954)
  2015   – Ingrid van Houten-Groeneveld, Dutch astronomer and academic (b. 1921)
2018 – Bill Maynard, English actor (b. 1928)
2020 – Manolis Glezos, Greek left-wing politician, journalist, author, and folk hero (b. 1922) 
  2020   – Bill Withers, American singer-songwriter (b. 1938)
2021 – G. Gordon Liddy, chief operative in the Watergate scandal (b. 1930)
  2021   – Myra Frances, British actress (b. 1942)

Holidays and observances
Christian feast day:
Blessed Amadeus IX, Duke of Savoy
Blessed Maria Restituta Kafka
John Climacus
Mamertinus of Auxerre
Quirinus of Neuss
Thomas Son Chasuhn, Marie-Nicolas-Antoine Daveluy (part of The Korean Martyrs)
Tola of Clonard
March 30 (Eastern Orthodox liturgics)
Land Day (Palestine)
National Doctors' Day (United States)
Spiritual Baptist/Shouter Liberation Day (Trinidad and Tobago)
School Day of Non-violence and Peace (Spain)

References

External links

 BBC: On This Day
 
 Historical Events on March 30

Days of the year
March